Rafael de Sá Rodrigues (born 23 March 1992), commonly known as Rafinha, is a Brazilian footballer who plays for Muang Loei United in the Thai League 3.

Career statistics

Club

Notes

References

1992 births
Living people
Brazilian footballers
Brazilian expatriate footballers
Association football forwards
Campeonato Brasileiro Série B players
Centro de Futebol Zico players
America Football Club (RJ) players
Duque de Caxias Futebol Clube players
Esporte Clube Tigres do Brasil players
Mogi Mirim Esporte Clube players
Nõmme Kalju FC players
Mesquita Futebol Clube players
Lao Toyota F.C. players
Brazilian expatriate sportspeople in Estonia
Expatriate footballers in Estonia
Brazilian expatriate sportspeople in Laos
Expatriate footballers in Laos
Brazilian expatriate sportspeople in Thailand
Expatriate footballers in Thailand
Sportspeople from Recife